Alexei Filippov may refer to:

Alexei Filippov (ice hockey, born 1989), Russian professional ice hockey player 
Alexei Filippov (ice hockey, born 1994), Russian professional ice hockey player